Seven Oaks is a city in Polk County, Texas, United States. The population was 111 at the 2010 census.

Geography

Seven Oaks is located at  (30.853567, –94.856427).

US 59 runs through the city.

Demographics

As of the census of 2000, there were 131 people, 48 households, and 34 families residing in the city. The population density was 94.3 people per square mile (36.4/km). There were 75 housing units at an average density of 54.0/sq mi (20.8/km). The racial makeup of the city was 22.90% White, 58.02% African American, 5.34% Asian, 10.69% from other races, and 3.05% from two or more races. Hispanic or Latino of any race were 12.98% of the population.

There were 48 households, out of which 37.5% had children under the age of 18 living with them, 47.9% were married couples living together, 18.8% had a female householder with no husband present, and 27.1% were non-families. 25.0% of all households were made up of individuals, and 16.7% had someone living alone who was 65 years of age or older. The average household size was 2.73 and the average family size was 3.23.

In the city, the population was spread out, with 28.2% under the age of 18, 6.9% from 18 to 24, 29.8% from 25 to 44, 19.8% from 45 to 64, and 15.3% who were 65 years of age or older. The median age was 36 years. For every 100 females, there were 114.8 males. For every 100 females age 18 and over, there were 91.8 males.

The median income for a household in the city was $34,500, and the median income for a family was $34,750. Males had a median income of $31,500 versus $17,500 for females. The per capita income for the city was $15,504. There were 10.3% of families and 7.9% of the population living below the poverty line, including no under eighteens and 15.4% of those over 64.

Education
The City of Seven Oaks is served by the Corrigan-Camden Independent School District and the Leggett Independent School District, each having a portion of Seven Oaks. Corrigan-Camden High School is operated by the former.

The Texas Legislature designated Polk County as being in the boundary of Angelina College's district.

References

Cities in Polk County, Texas
Cities in Texas